Goffs Academy is a selective secondary school and sixth form with academy status located in Cheshunt, Hertfordshire, England with around 1,300 students.

The school's motto was "Sola Virtus Invicta", (which roughly translates from Latin to "strength of character alone remains invincible"), in 2006 it was changed to "Respect Confidence Achievement" and in 2020 the motto was changed to "Respectful Resilient Responsible".

The school has had seven head teachers to date: Dr Colin Hadley, Dr John Versey, Mrs Jan Cutler, Mrs Paula Kenning, Mrs Alison Garner, (who took over in September 2010 ), Mr Ben Pearce and Mr Mark Ellis.

In the most recent Ofsted report the school was deemed "good."

Houses
Goffs Academy consisted of six houses, each named after an influential person from history: Brontë, Churchill, Columbus, Curie, Mandela and Monet. The original house names that existed during the Dr Hadley administration were Davies, represented in yellow, Trayhern in purple, Booker house in green and Morgan in red. These houses would compete in inter-house sports and enterprise competitions, and tutorial form and registration sessions would be organised in mixed year groups under each house. However, changes introduced in 2009 have taken emphasis off of the house structure – form lessons now occur in year groups, and many inter-house championships have not been reformed to fit the new system. The six-house structure was introduced in 2002; the original house structure consisted of four houses: Davies, Booker, Morgan and Trayhern. House events often took place including charitable activities towards each house's chosen charity. In 2014 the houses were renamed from Holmes, Pratchett, Branson and Westwood, to Hawk, Phoenix, Falcon and Eagle. Inter-house championships and competitions are being re-introduced within this system to reinvigorate community spirit in the school.

At the end of each year, awards are given to the house with the best achievement, best performance in the weekly quiz, and best attendance level. There is also an overall "best house" award.

Sports
Many of Goffs' sports teams have performed well at the county and in some cases national level. Aside from this, the school often runs inter-house competitions in various sports, such as rugby and a swimming gala in which students and teachers can take part.

The school hosts a sports day annually, held in the summer, which consists of track and field events.

Sporting Facilities at the school include Astro-turf, Sports Hall and a Large Field.

Notable former pupils
 Suzannah Dunn, historical fiction author

Goffs School
 Zai Bennett, television executive
 David Bentley, professional footballer
 Rebecca Morelle (1990-97), BBC science correspondent
 Emma Witter, professional sculpturist.

Goffs Grammar School
 Richard Lewis, professional tennis player, Chair of Sport England, chief executive officer The All England Lawn Tennis Club, Wimbledon.

See also
Goffs-Churchgate Academy

References

Academies in Hertfordshire
Secondary schools in Hertfordshire
Educational institutions established in 1964
Cheshunt
1964 establishments in England